Romain Bellenger (Paris, 18 January 1894 — Cahors, 25 November 1981) was a French road racing cyclist who came third in the 1923 Tour de France and eighth in the 1924 Tour de France and won three stages.

Major results

1919
Circuit de Paris
1920
Circuit des villes d'eaux d'Auvergne
Criterium des Aiglons
Paris-Dunkerque
Paris-Nancy
1921
Tour de France:
Winner stage 2
Circuit de Paris
1922
Tour de France:
Winner stage 2
1923
Tour de France:
 3rd, Overall classification
 Winner stage 13
 Yellow jersey, After Stages 4 and 5
Tour du Vaucluse
1924
Tour de France:
 8th, Overall classification
 1st, Stage 2 (371 km)
 1st, Stage 14 (433 km)
1925
Tour de France:
Winner stage 2
Giro della provincia Milano (joint with Achille Souchard
1927
Paris-Lille
1928
Paris-Chateauroux
Paris-Lille

External links 

French male cyclists
French Tour de France stage winners
1894 births
1981 deaths
Cyclists from Paris